The Pastoral Amusements, is a series of tapestries designed between 1720 and 1730 by Jean-Baptiste Oudry for Noël-Antoine de Mérou, then director of the Royal Beauvais Tapestry Manufactory.
The first production of the designs took place at Beauvais in 1731.
After enjoying huge success the series was later adapted and further developed at Aubusson by Jean-Baptiste Huet the elder (d. 1811).

There are eight designs in the original series 
 Le cheval fondu 
 Colin-maillard
 La Bergère
 Le pied de Boeuf
 Le joueur d'Osselets
 La Balançoire
 Le joueur de broches
 Le joueur de musette

References
J. Badin, Tapisseries de Beauvais, Paris, 1909
D. Chevalier, Tapisseries d'Aubusson et de Felletin, Paris, 1988

Tapestries
French art
Rococo art
1720s works